The Forster ministry was the fifth ministry of the Colony of New South Wales, and was led by William Forster. Forster was elected in the first free elections for the New South Wales Legislative Assembly held in March 1856. He was asked to form Government after the second Cowper ministry lost an educational bill in the Assembly.

The title of Premier was widely used to refer to the Leader of Government, but not enshrined in formal use until 1920.

There was no party system in New South Wales politics until 1887. Under the constitution, ministers were required to resign to recontest their seats in a by-election when appointed. Such ministerial by-elections were usually uncontested and on this occasion William Forster (Queanbeyan) and Saul Samuel (Orange) were re-elected unopposed, while John Black was comfortably re-elected at the East Sydney by-election.

This ministry covers the period of just four months from 27 October 1859 until 8 March 1860, when Forster resigned his commission.

Composition of ministry

 
Ministers are members of the Legislative Assembly unless otherwise noted.

See also

Self-government in New South Wales
Members of the New South Wales Legislative Assembly, 1859–1860

References

 

New South Wales ministries
1859 establishments in Australia
1860 disestablishments in Australia